Lise Arricastre (born 17 June 1991) is a French rugby union player. She represented  at the 2014 Women's Rugby World Cup. She was a member of the squad that won their fourth Six Nations title in 2014.

Arricastre was in the squad that toured the United States in a successful three-test series in 2013.

References

1991 births
Living people
French female rugby union players
French people of Basque descent
Sportspeople from Gers